Hila Rosen-Glickstein (born 5 September 1977) is a former professional tennis player from Israel.

Biography
Rosen, who was born in Haifa, played in a total of 32 Fed Cup ties for Israel. She debuted in 1994 and had one of her career best wins in the 1997 Fed Cup when she beat Russia's Anna Kournikova.

At the age of 20 she turned professional, reaching a top ranking of 138 in the world in 1999. She made the round of 16 at the 2000 Tashkent Open and was a regular in grand slam qualifying draws.

In 2002 she made her final Fed Cup appearance, which was a World Group play-off against the United States.

Admitted into the Israel Bar Association in 2006, Rosen is a partner at M. Firon & Co, a law firm in Tel Aviv.

ITF Circuit finals

Singles: 10 (7-3)

Doubles: 17: (8-9)

References

External links
 
 
 

1977 births
Living people
Israeli female tennis players
Sportspeople from Haifa